Astathes partita is a species of beetle in the family Cerambycidae. It was described by Gahan in 1901. It is known from Sumatra and Malaysia.

References

P
Beetles described in 1901